St. Francis Catholic High School is a four-year, all-female college preparatory high school in Sacramento, California, United States. It is one of four Catholic high schools in Sacramento affiliated with the Roman Catholic Diocese of Sacramento, and draws students from over fifty private and public feeder schools in the California counties of Sacramento, Yolo, El Dorado and Placer. The school was established in 1940.

During the 2003–2004 school year, St. Francis completed the first phase of its campus renovation and expansion that doubled the size of its facilities. These new buildings include The Fine and Performing Arts Complex, Library/Resource Center, Gymnasium/Fitness Complex, four science labs, the Administration Building, and the Carlsen and Demetre Center for Campus Life (CLC).

History 
St. Francis started in the fall of 1940 with 12 female students from nearby St Francis Elementary. The school was run by the St. Francis Sisters of Penance and Christian Charity.

In 1975 the Sisters of Notre Dame and the Franciscan Sisters were no longer able to staff the school, and Bishop Alden J. Bell appointed the Sisters of the Apostles of the Sacred Heart of Jesus, who served until 1999.

List of presidents and principals

Notable alumnae 

 Lio Tipton, credited as Analeigh Tipton through to 2021, actress and a contestant on America's Next Top Model, Cycle 11
 Greta Gerwig (2002), actress and filmmaker
 Eleni Kounalakis (1985), Lieutenant Governor of California

External links

References 

 https://www.stfrancishs.org/news/alumnae-spotlight-eleni-kounalakis-85

Girls' schools in California
Catholic secondary schools in California
Educational institutions established in 1940
High schools in Sacramento, California
Roman Catholic Diocese of Sacramento
1940 establishments in California